Bolikhamsai (also Borikhamxay, Lao: ບໍລິຄໍາໄຊ) is a province of Laos. Pakxan, Thaphabat, Pakkading, Borikhane, Viengthong, and Khamkeut are its districts and Pakxan is its capital city. The province is the site of the Nam Theun 2 Dam, the country's largest hydroelectric project.

Bolikhansai province borders Xiangkhouang province to the northwest, Vietnam to the east, Khammouane province to the south, and Thailand to the west. The province includes the Annamite Range, stretching east to Vietnam, while to the west are the Mekong River and Thailand. At , the Nakai-Nam Theun National Park in Bolikhamsai and Khammouane provinces is the third largest protected area in Laos.

History
The province faced invasions from the Siamese throughout its history. The foundation of Paksan dates from the late nineteenth century. In 1836, the Siamese assumed suzerainty over Laos. After 1865, the invasions of "Hos", Chinese gangs from southern China, affected the provinces of Xieng Khouang and Bolikhamsai (Borikhane). In 1876, the King of Siam, Rama V, ordered the creation of the Muong Borikhane with the last survivors of the Ho invasion of 1874. The Muong of Borikhane was placed under the authority of Governor of Nong Khai.

In the 1890s, Christian missionaries of the Missions étrangères de Paris arrived on the Mekong River, a few miles from the mouth of the Nam Sane. They built a church at Paksan. By 1911, the Muong Borikhane had about 61 villages housing a population of about 4000 inhabitants. Paksane had grown to several thousand in 1937.

The modern province was formed in 1986 from parts of the Vientiane province and Khammuan. In recent times, religious tension has been apparent in the province. In February 2005, 100 villagers were forced to sell their possessions and prepare to be evicted in Kok Poh village in Borikham District, but the central authorities intervened to stop this.

Geography
Bolikhamsai province borders Xiangkhouang province to the northwest, Vietnam to the east, Khammouane province to the south, and Thailand to the west. Notable settlements include Pakxan, Borikham, Lak Sao, Muang Bo, Ban Hatkham, Ban Thana, Ban Thasi, Ban Hai, Ban Don, Ban Soppanga, Ban Pak Ham, Ban Naxon, Ban Kengbit, Ban Pakha, Ban Phayat, Ban Sopchat, Ban Muangcham and Ban Nap. The province includes the Annamite Range, stretching east to Vietnam, while to the west are the Mekong River and Thailand.

Bolikhamsai province has a rugged terrain, with large boulders and streams. The principal river is the Nam Kading, meaning 'water like a bell', a tributary of the Mekong; its catchment covers about 92% of the provincial area. The other main rivers are the Nam Muan, Nam Sat, and the Nam Tek. Waterfalls of note include the Tad Leuk, Tad Xay and Tad Xang. The longest mountain range in the province is the Phou Louang range, running to the southwest, the Phou Ao range to the southeast; the Thalabat range to the northwest, and the Pa Guang range to the northeast. In Khamkheuth District, there is karst limestone scenery, which is allegedly the largest formation of its type in Southeast Asia. The many rock pinnacles have formed stone forest similar to limestone outcrops in southern China.

Protected areas
At , Nakai-Nam Theun National Park in Bolikhamsai and Khammouane provinces is the third largest protected area in Laos. It includes mixed semi-tropical forests, reported in large areas of Indochina. The wetlands of the Nam Kading National Protected Area and the Phou Khao Khouay National Protected Area attract numerous migratory birds, and also has some 13 globally and 12 regionally endangered mammals such as the Asiatic black bear, clouded leopard, elephant, giant muntjac, gaur, sun bear, and tiger and both northern and southern white-cheeked crested gibbon. The saola (spindle horn) or Vii Quang ox (Pseudoryx nghetinhensis) was discovered in neighbouring Vietnam in 1992 and sighted since then in this conservation area. In 1996, the saola was discovered living in the adjoining Khammouane province.

Under the World Wildlife Fund (WWF) Greater Mekong Lao PDR Country Programme, studies have been carried out in the two forest areas in the province to assess the degree of sustainable rattan harvest and production as it provides significant income in whole of the Mekong region to rural villages. The forest areas covered are 349 ha of forest area in Ban Soupphouan (Nong Kan and Phu Sangnoy villages) and 364 ha in Phonthong. The species sampled were mak naeng (cardamom), bamboo shoots of many species, all year san (Lao lady palm), mushrooms, pak van, kha (galangal), wai houn (Daemonorops jenkinsiana rattan), phak kout (vegetable fern), wai khom (C. viminalis rattan), ya houa and ka don nam.

Mammals include tigers, Malayan sun bears, guars, giant muntjacs, elephants, clouded leopards, and Asiatic black bears. The mammal species protected under the Nam Kading National Protected Area are four critically endangered and endangered primate species: northern white-cheeked gibbons, southern white-cheeked gibbons, red-shanked douc langurs and two leaf-monkey species. Bird species recorded in the province are bulbuls  such as the bare-faced bulbul (Pycnonotus hualon), thrushes and the green cochoa (Cochoa viridis). Four species of hornbills are also reported.

Administrative divisions
The province is made up of the following districts:

Economy
Laos's largest hydroelectric project, Nam Theun 2 Dam (NT2), began operation in March 2010. At the time of signing in 2005, NT2 was the largest foreign investment in Laos, the world's largest private sector cross-border power project financing, the largest private sector hydroelectric project financing, and one of the largest internationally financed IPP projects in Southeast Asia. The dam also marked a return by the World Bank to funding large-scale infrastructure, after a decade-long hiatus. The dam exports energy to neighboring Thailand, thus is important to the regional economy. Along with Khammouane and Savannakhet provinces, it is one of the main tobacco producing areas of Laos, and also one of the main producers of sugar cane and oranges.

Landmarks
Wat Phabath and Wat Phonsanh temples are important pilgrimage centres between Vientiane and Pakxan. Wat Phabath is said to have a very large footprint of Buddha and numerous murals. The location provides vistas of the Mekong River. Lak Sao, on the border, has the Nampao Checkpoint, crossing into Vietnam.

References

Sources
 
  

 
 

 
Provinces of Laos